Krähenberg is a municipality in Südwestpfalz district, in Rhineland-Palatinate, western Germany.

References

Kashofen
Südwestpfalz